The 1971 Men's Hockey World Cup was the inaugural edition of the Hockey World Cup. It took place from 15 to 24 October in Barcelona, Spain. Pakistan were the inaugural World Cup winners, beating Spain in the final, 1–0.

Participants 
The first World Cup was the only one without qualification. It was an invitational tournament where the top ten teams from five continents were invited by the International Hockey Federation by merit of their performances in the Summer Olympics. The teams were divided into two groups for five each, with the top two proceeding to the semi-finals after the round-robin stage. Gold medalists at the 1968 Olympics, Pakistan, were grouped in 'B' alongside runners-up Australia, and Spain, the Netherlands and Japan. Group 'A' included Argentina, France, India, Kenya and West Germany.

Results

Preliminary round

Pool A

Pool B

Classification round

Ninth and tenth place

Fifth to eighth place classification

Crossover

Seventh and eighth place

Fifth and sixth place

First to fourth place classification

Semi-finals

Third and fourth place

Final

Final squads
Pakistan
Muhammad Aslam, Akhtar ul Islam, Munawwar uz Zaman, Jahangir Butt, Riaz Ahmed, Fazal ur Rehman, Khalid Mahmood, Ashfaq Ahmed, Abdul Rashid, Islahuddin Siddique, Shahnaz Sheikh, Muhammad Asad Malik 

Spain
Luis Twose, Antonio Nogués (sub Jamie Amat), Francisco Segura, Juan Amat, Francisco Fábregas Bosch, Jorge Fábregas, Vicente Llorach, Juan Quintana, Francisco Amat, José Sallés, Agustín Masaña

Statistics

Final standings

Goalscorers

World Eleven 
The journalists covering the competition selected a 'world eleven' on 25 October 1971. Japan goalkeeper Satokazu Otsuka was named as player of the tournament.

  Satokazu Otsuka
  Nico Spits
  Michael Kindo
  Francisco Segura
  Ajit Pal Singh
  Jorge Fábregas
  Fazalur Rehman
  Wolfgang Baumgart
  Ashok Kumar
  Muhammad Asad Malik
  Shahnaz Sheikh

References

1971
1971 in Spanish sport
International field hockey competitions hosted by Catalonia
1971 in field hockey
October 1971 sports events in Europe
1971,Men's Hockey World Cup
Sports competitions in Barcelona